The men's 4 x 100 metres relay at the 2010 African Championships in Athletics was held on July 29–30.

Medalists

Results

Heats
Qualification: First 3 teams of each heat (Q) plus the next 2 fastest (q) qualified for the final.

Final

External links
Results

Relay
Relays at the African Championships in Athletics